Moses Gikenyi (born 19 November 1972) is a Kenyan former footballer. He played in two matches for the Kenya national football team in 2004. He was also named in Kenya's squad for the 2004 African Cup of Nations tournament.

At the club level he played for St Michel United in Seychelles.

References

1972 births
Living people
Kenyan footballers
Kenya international footballers
2004 African Cup of Nations players
Place of birth missing (living people)
Association football defenders
St Michel United FC players
Kenyan expatriate footballers
Kenyan expatriate sportspeople in Seychelles
Expatriate footballers in Seychelles